The Trenton Six is the group name for six African-American defendants tried for murder of an elderly white shopkeeper in January 1948 in Trenton, New Jersey. The six young men were convicted in August 1948 by an all-white jury of the murder and sentenced to death.

Their case was taken up as a major civil rights case, because of injustices after their arrests and questions about the trial. The Civil Rights Congress and the NAACP had legal teams that represented three men each in appeals to the State Supreme Court. It found fault with the court's instruction to the jury, and remanded the case to a lower court for retrial, which took place in 1951. That resulted in a mistrial, requiring a third trial. Four of the defendants were acquitted. Ralph Cooper pleaded guilty, implicating the other five in the crime. Collis English was convicted of murder, but the jury recommended mercy – life in prison rather than execution.

The civil rights groups appealed again to the State Supreme Court, which found fault with the court, and remanded the case to the lower court for retrial of the two defendants who were sentenced to life. One was convicted in 1952 and the other pleaded guilty; both were sentenced to life. Collis English died in late December that year in prison. Ralph Cooper was paroled in 1954 and disappeared from the records.

Crime
On the morning of January 27, 1948, William Horner (1875–1948) opened his second-hand furniture store as usual, at 213 North Broad Street in Trenton. His common-law wife worked with him there. A while later, several young African-American men entered the store. One or more killed Horner by hitting him in the head with a soda bottle; some also assaulted his wife. She could not say for sure how many men were involved with the attack, saying two to four light-skinned African-American males in their teens had assaulted them.

Arrests
The Trenton police, pressured to solve the case, arrested: Ralph Cooper, 24; Collis English, 23; McKinley Forrest, 35; John McKenzie, 24; James Thorpe, 24; and Horace Wilson, 37, on February 11, 1948. All were arrested without warrants, were held without being given access to attorneys, and were questioned for as long as four days before being brought before a judge. Five of the six men charged with the murder signed confessions written by the police.

Trial
The trial began on June 7, 1948, when the State of New Jersey opened its case against the six based on the five signed confessions obtained by the Trenton police. There was no other forensic evidence, and Horner's widow could not identify the men as the ones in her store.

The defendants were assigned four attorneys, one of whom was Raymond Pace Alexander, an African American. On August 6, 1948, all six men were convicted and sentenced to death. All six had provided alibis for that day and had repudiated their confessions, signed under duress. An appeal was filed and an automatic stay of execution granted.

Appeal
In the process of appeal, the Communist Party USA took on the legal defense of half the defendants, with Emanuel Hirsch Bloch acting as their attorney.

The NAACP (National Association for the Advancement of Colored People) defended the other three men, seeking to get their convictions overturned.  Among the NAACP attorneys were Thurgood Marshall, who led many legal efforts by the organization; he later was appointed as the first African American to the Supreme Court of the United States; Clifford Roscoe Moore Sr., later appointed as U.S. Commissioner for Trenton, New Jersey, the first African American appointed to such a position since post-Civil War Reconstruction; and Raymond Pace Alexander, later to be appointed as a judge in Pennsylvania.

In 1949 the State Supreme Court remanded the case to the lower court for retrial, ruling that the jury had been improperly charged in the first case. In the course of the trial, the defense teams revealed that evidence had been manufactured. The medical examiner in Trenton was found guilty of perjury.

Outcome
After a mistrial, four of the men were acquitted in a third trial. Collis English was convicted. Ralph Cooper pleaded guilty, implicating the other five in the crime. The jury recommended mercy for these two men, with prison sentences rather than capital punishment. These two convictions were also appealed; the State Supreme Court said the court had erred again. It remanded the case to the lower court for a fourth trial in 1952.

English suffered a heart attack (myocardial infarction) soon after the trial and died in December 1952 in prison. Cooper served a portion of his prison sentence and was released on parole in 1954 for good behavior.

Legacy
Because of legal abuses in the treatment of suspects after the arrests, the case attracted considerable attention. The Civil Rights Congress and the NAACP generated publicity to highlight the racial inequities in the railroading of the suspects, their lack of access to counsel, the chief witness' inability to identify them, and other issues. Figures such as W. E. B. Du Bois to Pete Seeger, then active in leftist movements, joined the campaign for publicity about obtaining justice in the trials of these men. Albert Einstein also protested the injustice. Commentary and protests were issued from many nations.

The accused
Ralph Cooper (1924-?), pleaded guilty in the 4th trial and was sentenced to life. After being paroled in 1954, he disappeared from records.
Collis English (1925–1952). Shortly after the fourth trial, he died in prison on December 31, 1952, of a heart attack. 
McKinley Forrest (1913–1982). He was the brother-in-law of Collis English. Acquitted in the third trial in 1951.
John McKenzie (1925-?), acquitted in 1951.
James Henry Thorpe Jr. (1913–1955), acquitted in 1951. He died in a car crash on March 25, 1955.
Horace Wilson (1911–2000), acquitted in 1951.

Timeline
 1948 William Horner, a seventy-two-year-old junk shop dealer, was killed and his common-law wife beaten in Trenton, New Jersey on January 27. Although police alleged the motive was robbery, they recovered more than $1,500 from Horner's body. 
 1948 The Trenton police arrested six African-American men, questioning them without access to attorneys. Five of the six men charged with the murder signed confessions on February 11.
1948 The State of New Jersey opened its case against the six based on the five signed confessions. The defendants were assigned four attorneys on June 7.
1948 All were convicted at trial in August and sentenced to death. All six had provided alibis for the time of the crime and repudiated their confessions. The defense raised serious doubts about the legality of the confessions. An appeal was filed with the State Supreme Court and an automatic stay of execution granted on August 6.
1948 Bessie Mitchell, sister of Collis English, started a public speaking campaign questioning the trial. The Civil Rights Congress, the legal arm of the communist party, hired O. John Rogge, William Patterson and Solomon Golat to serve as defense for three of the men, seeking to overturn the convictions. The NAACP represented the other three men, seeking the same goal.
1949 Communist Party USA, American Civil Liberties Union, and NAACP supported the appeal. The State Supreme Court remanded the case to the lower court for retrial.
1951 Prosecutor Mario Volpe's attack of appendicitis causes delay in the second trial on February 5.
1951 Second trial resumed on March 5. 	
1951 Four of the defendants were acquitted. Collis English and Ralph Cooper found guilty and sentenced to life imprisonment on June 14 	
1951 A second appeal was made to the State Supreme Court for the two remaining defendants on September 11.
1952 In November, the court ordered a new trial for English and Cooper.
1952 English died in prison on December 31.
1953 Ralph Cooper pleaded guilty and was sentenced to prison. 
1954 Cooper was paroled for good behavior.
1955 Former defendant James Henry Thorpe Jr. died in a car crash on March 25.

See also
Scottsboro Boys
Jena Six

References

External links
 Peter Salwen, "A 'Northern Lynching', 1949: Remembering the "Trenton Six" Case, Salwen website 
 Jon Blackwell, "1948: A cry for justice", The Trentonian, hosted at Capital Century website
 "Six Minus Four: Trenton's Way Out", The Nation; July 21, 1951
 Correspondence from Irv Feiner, University of Missouri Kansas City
 Images of the Trenton Six, Afro-American newspaper]

Further reading
Elwood M. Dean, The Story of the Trenton Six, (New Century Publishers, 1949)
[http://www.cathydknepper.com/trenton_six.html Cathy D. Knepper, Jersey Justice: The Story of the Trenton Six], (Rivergate Books, 2011)

History of African-American civil rights
History of Trenton, New Jersey
Quantified groups of defendants
African-American history of New Jersey
20th-century American trials